The 1919 Oxford University by-election was held on 19–24 March 1919 after the incumbent Coalition Conservative MP, Rowland Prothero was created as the first Lord Ernle.  It was retained by the Conservative candidate Prof. Charles Oman.

Result

References

Oxford University by-election
Oxford University by-election
By-elections to the Parliament of the United Kingdom in Oxford University
Oxford University by-election